Montcalm High School, a "school within a school", is located in Montcalm, West Virginia, United States. It is the smallest secondary school in the Mercer County Schools district, and currently has  approximately 375 students enrolled in grades 7-12.

History 
MHS began in 1931, housing grades 7-10. 11th and 12th grade students went on to Bramwell High School. In 1954, a west wing was added to accommodate much needed classrooms, which allowed students to graduate from this school for the first time.  In 1964, a gymnasium was built. Due to lack of room, students had to use the elementary school next door to have lunch. In the late 70s a new elementary school was constructed, and students were then bused to the new elementary school.  In 1983, a new school was completed, complete with a gym, commons area known as the lunch room, and a band section. In 1991, Bramwell High School was closed, and was consolidated with Montcalm High School.

References

Educational institutions established in 1931
Public high schools in West Virginia
Schools in Mercer County, West Virginia
Public middle schools in West Virginia
1931 establishments in West Virginia